Las 13 esposas de Wilson Fernández is a Mexican black comedy streaming television series that premiered on May 12, 2017, on Blim. Based on the Argentine series of the same name produced in 2014. It stars Martín Altomaro as the titular character.

The series follows the story of a pianist who comes to a club in search of work, there he talks to the boss, this takes place in one day but during the series Wilson goes telling his anecdotes that lived with each of his wives.

The series was renewed to a second season on June 27, 2017.

Plot 
The series tells the life of an incurable musician and romantic. Wilson fervently believes in marriage but for one reason or another, each of his wives ends up leaving. He works as a keyboard player in a sports club controlled by a dark group but also of endearing characters.

Cast 
 Martín Altomaro as Wilson Fernández
 Paulina Dávila as Camila
 Ximena Romo as Emilia
 Andrea Guerra as Eliana
 Cassandra Sánchez Navarro as Gloria
 Ilse Salas as Paulina
 Adriana Llabrés as Martha / Silvia
 Camila Selser as Alicia
 Tato Alexander as Alfonsina
 Zuria Vega as María Teresa
 Esmeralda Pimentel as Amanda
 Mónica Huarte as Ema
 Alejandra Ambrosi as Carolina
 Jolein Rutgers as Elizabeth

Episodes

References 

2010s Mexican television series
Mexican comedy television series
Blim TV original programming
2017 Mexican television series debuts
Spanish-language television shows
2010s black comedy television series